Albert Morgan Pilkington (December 25, 1902 – August 3, 1953), better known as Tod Morgan, was an American boxer who took the World Jr. Lightweight Championship in 1925 in Los Angeles and held it for an impressive four years. His managers were his stepfather Frank Morgan, and later Frank Churchill, who also trained Mike Ballerino, a former Jr. Lightweight champion. His trainer was "Spider" Roach.

Early life and career
Morgan was born in the small town of Dungeness, Washington, near Sequim, on December 25, 1902.

Tod's stepfather, Fred, put Tod in boxing as a means of getting some strength into his body. His first professional fights were in 1920, in Concrete, and Anacortes, Washington, against Johnny Bitoni, and Pete Moe, who knocked him out. After these two bouts, his stepfather Fred moved him to California. After arriving in Eureka where he fought two bouts with George Green, his stepfather began training him in the backroom of the Hoffman House in Vallejo, California, a soft-drink parlor and lunch room. Tod's first fight in Valejo was around October 1920.

On May 24, 1922, Morgan defeated California boxer Ad Rubidoux at the Oakland Arena in Oakland, California in a ten-round points decision. The bout was fiercely fought and considered the most interesting of the bouts fought that night.

Taking the Pacific Coast Featherweight Title, August 1923
Morgan first took the Pacific Coast Title on August 22, 1923, against Bud Ridley in a six-round decision in Seattle. In a decisive win, he outpointed Ridley in every round but the opening of the sixth. As in previous fights, Morgan used his left to keep his opponent at a distance. Ridley's crouching style was ineffective against the left of Morgan.

In another six round points decision, Morgan defended his Pacific Coast Title on September 5, 1923, against Ridley in a rematch in Seattle. Most ringside critics felt that Morgan had defeated Ridley even more decisively than in their first match. Morgan outboxed, outslugged, and effectively out maneuvered his opponent. Morgan landed far more punches than Ridley, who showed gameness, but was clearly outmatched.

On January 22, 1924, Morgan knocked out accomplished boxer Frankie Britt in the third round at Crystal Pool in Seattle, Washington, retaining the Pacific Coast Featherweight Title.

Wins over Joe Gorman
Morgan's first meeting with Joe Gorman on February 26, 1924, ended in a six-round draw. As the bout was non-title due to Gorman's weight of 130, the bout was tame, and Morgan landed blows easily, though not with great steam. Some ringside felt Morgan had the edge in the bout.

On December 30, 1924, Morgan defeated Doc Snell at the Crystal Pool in Seattle, Washington in a six-round points decision. He had drawn with Snell two weeks earlier in Tacoma. In their Tacoma bout, several critics ringside felt Morgan had the edge, but the boxing was fast and probably close. Snell would take the Pacific Coast Featherweight Title in January 1927, and would later take the Pacific Coast Jr. Lightweight Title. He had formerly held the North Central Washington Featherweight Title.

On June 28, 1927, Morgan would lose to Snell in an unusual six round outdoor bout in Seattle. In the first two rounds, Morgan used his left jab cautiously to control Snell and defend against him, although Snell seemed to have an advantage in the third. Morgan floored Snell twice in the fourth round, once for a count of five. Snell recovered and decked Morgan in the fourth with a strong blow behind the ear. He dropped Morgan again briefly in that round and then continued in the fifth and sixth with a decided advantage as Morgan still appeared groggy. Snell may have come close to a knockout at several points in the final two rounds.

Morgan would meet Gorman again on October 21 of that year for a fairly easy decision in six rounds in Seattle. On June 10, 1925, Morgan would defeat Gorman again in Oakland in an easy ten round points decision.  Gorman was knocked to the mat in the first, and was not a major threat in the following rounds.

Taking the World Jr. Lightweight Title from Mike Ballerino, December 1925
Morgan took the World Jr. Lightweight Title on December 2, 1925, in a ten-round technical knockout against Mike Ballerino at Olympic Auditorium in Los, Angeles. Though putting up a typically aggressive and tireless display, the Lincoln Star wrote that Ballerino only won the first round decisively. He was down for a nine count in the third round, outpunched badly against the ropes in the sixth, and had the crowd shouting to end the bout by the ninth and tenth rounds. The Associated Press wrote that Ballerino's seconds had his manager Frank Churchill throw in the towel, though they already knew Morgan had clinched the bout on points.

Defeating former World Junior Lightweight Champion Steve Sullivan, June 1926
On June 3, 1926, Morgan fought Steve "Kid" Sullivan, a former World Junior Lightweight Champion, at the Brooklyn National League Baseball Park in front of 40,000 enthralled boxing fans. Morgan convincingly beat Sullivan in a sixth round Technical Knockout. The Oakland Tribune wrote Morgan dealt Sullivan "one of the worst beatings a battler ever received in an Eastern Ring" The Wilkes-Barre Evening News, wrote "Tod Morgan... was not in the slightest danger of losing the world's junior lightweight championship while fighting Steve Kid Sullivan at Ebbets Field last night". Sullivan was down for the count of nine in both the first and second rounds. In the sixth round, Sullivan's handlers tossed in the towel. Sullivan's most apparent injuries were cuts to his nose.

Defense of the Jr. Lightweight Title, Joe Glick, September 1926
On September 30, 1926, Morgan defeated Jewish boxer Joe Glick in a fifteen-round Jr. Lightweight Championship bout at Madison Square Garden. The Associated Press gave Morgan eleven rounds, with three even, and only one to Glick. The A. P. wrote that Morgan put on "one of the nicest exhibitions of boxing put on at the Garden in some time."

Defense of the Jr. Lightweight Title, Johnny Dundee, October 1926
On October 19, 1926, Morgan defeated Johnny Dundee before 14,0000 spectators in a World Jr. Lightweight Title match in a ten-round points decision at Recreation Park in San Francisco.  Morgan was considered to have taken six of the ten rounds against the veteran Dundee. Dundee, eleven years older than Morgan, may have injured his hand in the third round, and by the eighth was in a decided disadvantage.

Defense of the Jr. Lightweight Title, Carl Duane, November 1926
On November 19, 1926, Morgan defeated Carl Duane in a close match at Madison Square Garden in New York that drew 14,260 fans.  The referees and judges scored a fifteen-round unanimous decision for Morgan, but the bout had its close rounds. Morgan said referring to Duane, that "he gave me the hardest fight I've had since I won the title." Morgan was bruised notably after the bout. Morgan was injured by hooks to his face most notably in the thirteenth and fourteenth rounds, but Morgan scored frequently with blows to the head of Duane throughout the bout, and his defense seemed somewhat more effective. Duane took considerable punishment in the final round but managed to fight the bout without once being knocked to the mat. Morgan fought at 127 1/2 pounds.

Defense of the Jr. Lightweight Title, Vic Foley, May 1927
On May 28, 1927, Morgan defended his Jr. Lightweight Title again against Vic Foley in a twelve-round points decision in Vancouver, Canada. Morgan had taken six months off from active boxing prior to the bout, but was well matched with Foley, who gave him no major trouble in the bout. Morgan twice dropped Foley with two-fisted attacks. The majority of ringside critics gave eight rounds to Morgan with two even, and two to Foley. Foley was down for a count of eight in the second and more briefly in the fifth. Foley made his best stand in the fourth when he sent Morgan to the ropes.

Frank Churchill becomes sole boxing manager
After Fred Morgan, Tod's acting manager died in a boating accident around August 1927, Tod adopted Billie, his stepfather's four-year-old son, on February 15, 1929.  Frank Churchill, who had managed Mike Ballerino, a Jr. Lightweight Champion, and Filipino Flyweight Champion Pancho Villa became Morgan's sole manager.

Difficult defense of the Jr. Lightweight Title, Joe Glick, December 1927

In a Super Featherweight title fight that was recognized by both the NBA and the New York State Athletic Commission (NYSAC), Morgan defeated New York Jewish boxer Joe Glick in a fourteenth round disqualification before 10,000 spectators at New York's Madison Square Garden on December 16, 1927. Glick, who was a solid opponent, dropped Morgan for nine counts once in the second and twice in the fifth, and may have won the bout had he not been disqualified for a low left to the groin in the fourteenth by referee Eddie Forbes. Morgan was hurt by loops to the head, often to the jaw, and digs to the body at several points in the bout. Glick began the first with a strong and effective attack against Morgan. Glick was first warned of a low blow in the third round, and had lost previous fights to low blows. Frank Getty of the Arizona Republic believed Glick may have hit below the belt on six occasions, but this was far from the opinion of the writer for the Brooklyn Daily Eagle, who believed Glick had actually hit below the belt on only a few occasions. Getty of the Republic also wrote Glick may have head-butted once or twice in the bout, another clear foul.

Two World Jr. Lightweight Title Defenses with Eddie Martin, May, July 1928

In May and July 1928, Morgan defeated talented "Cannonball" Eddie Martin, former World Bantamweight Champion, in two World Jr. Lightweight Title Defenses at Madison Square Garden and Ebbets Field in Brooklyn. Morgan won both bouts in two fifteen round points decisions, but the fighting was fierce, particularly in their second bout.

In their brutal July bout, the Associated Press gave Morgan eight of the fifteen rounds, and Martin only four, with three even. The fighting was close throughout the contest. Morgan received a gash from a head butt in the first round, while Morgan cut Martin's right cheek in the third. In the tenth, Martin's right eyebrow was cut deeply. Morgan also had a large knot above his right eye, a bloodly nose, and a cut behind his right ear.

Two World Jr. Lightweight Title Defenses with Santiago Zorilla, December 1928, April 1929
Morgan fought a ten-round draw with Panamanian Santiago Zorrilla on December 3, 1928, before 15,000, at the State Armory in San Francisco. Morgan scored frequently with rights to the face of his opponent, and in the tenth briefly sent Zorrilla to the mat, but he received a badly swollen eye in the ninth. Zorrilla may not have been of the caliber of many of Morgan's previous title opponents. Morgan was able to defend adequately against the more frequent blows of Zorilla.

On April 4, 1929, in another World Jr. Lightweight Title Match, Morgan won a ten-round points decision against Zorrilla before a capacity crowd at the Olympic Auditorium in Los Angeles. The bout had no knockdowns, and was fast, without either boxer taking a decided edge for long, though both boxers received and dealt a number of effective blows. The bout was refereed by navy Lieutenant Jack Kennedy, a common referee of Naval bouts and a close associate of both "Abe the Newsboy" Hollandersky and Jack Dempsey. Kennedy announced the winner of each round, giving four to Morgan, only one to Zorilla, with five tied. Zorrilla had a decided disadvantage in both reach and height, having a six-inch height disadvantage over the 5' 7 1/2" Morgan. His shorter reach may have accounted for Zorrilla's difficulty in landing many telling blows against the defense of Morgan. Morgan fought Zorrilla twice more in 1930, receiving a win and another draw.

On May 12, 1931, Morgan lost to Cecil Payne at the Olympic Auditorium in Los Angeles. Payne injured Morgan's right eye in the first which affected Morgan's vision throughout the bout, and the eye was nearly closed by the third round.  Morgan was down briefly for a count of one in the seventh from a staggering left to the chin, but the boxing was close in some respects through the bout. Morgan may have been affected by a wrenched shoulder he had suffered around mid-April which had forced him to delay this bout with Payne. Payne took six of the ten rounds.

Last defense of the Jr. Lightweight Title, Sal Sorio, May 1929
In his final World Jr. Lightweight Title match, on May 20, 1929, Morgan defeated "Baby" Sal Sorio at Wrigley Field in Los Angeles in a ten-round points decision. Though Sorio had been a highly effective knockout boxer, Morgan staged an effective defense taking eight of the ten rounds for a decision. As he had in other bouts, Morgan's long left made it frequently to the head and body of Sorio, holding off his attack. Sol had the champion in distress, however in both the third and eighth rounds. Morgan was down briefly in the third, and in the eighth punished Morgan with three of his signature short right jabs. Morgan, however used his superior ring experience and longer reach to gain the victory. On June 14, 1932, Morgan decisively defeated Carter in a seventh-round technical knockout at the Arcade Auditorium in Vancouver, Canada. It was a brutal defeat for Carter, and he was unable to continue in the seventh.

On July 9, 1928, Goldie Hess defeated Morgan, at the Olympic Auditorium in Los Angeles in a convincing ten round non-title points decision, though the scoring was only six rounds for Hess.

Fighting as a lightweight at 136 1/2 pounds on August 14, 1930, Morgan defeated black boxer Leslie "Wildcat" Carter at the Civic Auditorium in Seattle, Washington in a six-round points decision. After the first round, Morgan opened up with his characteristic left jab, and right crosses, hitting Carter repeatedly in the last five rounds. At 134 pounds, he had drawn with Carter on September 3, 1928, at the Arena in Vancouver, British Columbia.

At 136 1/4, on July 1, 1931, Morgan again defeated Goldie Hess at the Civic Ice Arena in Seattle in an 8-round points decision. In the feature non-title bout, Morgan characteristically used his highly effective left against Hess, often with blows to Hess's face. Morgan won the bout on points by a comfortable margin.

On August 19, 1931, Morgan defeated Frankie Stetson at the Auditorium in Oakland, California in a ten-round points decision. Stetson was down for a count of nine in the first from a left swing by Morgan. By the seventh, Stetson was cut by a shot to the right eye from Morgan. The referee gave eight of the ten rounds to Morgan with only two to Stetson.

On September 3, 1931, Morgan defeated Cecil Payne in a ten-round points decision in Sacramento, California. Morgan appeared to be the aggressor through all but three rounds, though Payne was effective in the third round.

Fighting at 137 3/4 on September 22, 1931, Morgan defeated Eddie Thomas at the Armory in Portland, Oregon, in a ten-round points decision. In the fourth round, Thomas was down for a count of eight from a left hook to the chin from Morgan.

Other bouts with Sal Sorio, 1932
Morgan fought Sorio on two other occasions, on February 17, 1932, winning in a ten-round points decision in Sorio's home turf of San Bernardino and on August 19, 1932, at Legion Stadium in Hollywood, winning in  an eighth round disqualification. In their February 17 bout, before a crowd of 900, Morgan piled up a commanding lead in points in each of the ten rounds. In the fourth and seventh Sorio attempted to rally, but his blows did not connect effectively against the defense of Morgan. Morgan effectively countered the left hook of Sorio to the body, which was an important blow in Sorio's offensive strategy.

In their August 19 bout, Sorio seemed to have been losing the bout, having been dropped twice to the mat in the sixth round, once for a count of nine. In the eighth, Sorio landed a particularly "offensive punch" below the belt to Morgan and the referee ended the bout, though he had been warned about low blows in the previous round.

Losing the World Jr. Lightweight Title to Benny Bass, December 1929

Morgan lost the belt on December 20, 1929, when he was KO'd by Benny Bass in the second of fifteen rounds at Madison Square Garden. By this time the division was usually referenced as the Super Featherweight Title, though the weight range was nearly identical to Jr. Lightweight. Bass was the former 1927 NBA World Featherweight Champion, and an important opponent. The first round of their December bout appeared to be clearly taken by Morgan. The reigning champion connected with two blows to the chin of Bass that seemed to stagger him. Unexpectedly, in the opening of the second, Bass became the aggressor with their first close flurry of blows causing Morgan to drop to the canvas for a count of nine after a strong right to the jaw. Morgan was up only to have Bass follow him around the ring aggressively and land two more strong rights to the jaw which landed Morgan on the mat again. Morgan attempted, but was unable to rise fully before sinking again to the mat. Both of Morgan's drops to the mat occurred in less than a minute into the second round. The bout was exceptional for such a sudden and abrupt turn of events. An investigation was held after the bout on suspicion of a fixed bout, as some believed the betting was 4 to 1 for Bass before the fight, but the ruling held. Davis J. Walsh of the Times Herald, felt strongly that the fight was not fixed.

On July 23, 1930, Morgan defeated Don Fraser at Natatorium Park before a crowd of 6,000 in a six-round points decision in Spokane, Washington. Jack Dempsey, a California resident at the time, refereed the bout.

Bouts with Eddie Mack
On August 28, 1930, Morgan defeated Eddie Mack for the only time in Seattle in a six-round unanimous decision. In a previous match on November 26, 1929, shortly before losing the World Jr. Lightweight Title, Morgan had lost to Mack in a ten-round points decision. On April 23, 1927, in a split decision, the referees called their ten-round bout at Civic Auditorium in Denver a draw.  Mack was a tall lightweight from Denver, and Morgan may not have matched up well with a boxer an inch and a half taller who had boxed primarily as a lightweight.

Taking the USA California Lightweight Championship, March 1931
On March 24, 1931, Morgan defeated black boxer Goldie Hess at the Olympic Auditorium in Los Angeles, in a ten-round points decision taking the USA California State Lightweight Championship. In a convincing victory, Morgan was given seven of the ten rounds with two to Hess and one even. Morgan was the aggressor, scoring points in every round effectively utilizing both rights and lefts. Morgan's greatest advantage was in the seventh when he scored with blows to the head of Hess. He was awarded the State Championship belt by actress Joan Blondell.

Win over former World Lightweight Champion Sammy Mandell, July 1932

On July 8, 1932, Morgan defeated 1926 World Lightweight Champion Sammy Mandell at Legion Stadium in Hollywood California. Mandell was making a comeback and Morgan reportedly won the decision without trouble, though the bout was slow and deliberate. Morgan had the best of the match in the second and seventh, and concentrated on Mandell's body.

Move to Australia, 1933, and service in WWII
In 1933, Morgan moved to Australia, where he lived and boxed until his retirement from boxing in 1942.

Boxing in Honolulu, Hawaii, December 1935
On December 10, 1935, Morgan fought Kid Moro in Honolulu in a bout that was billed as the Welterweight Championship of Hawaii. He won the bout in a ten-round points decision. The Oakland Tribune put the date for this fight as November 15, however, and reported that Moro had accumulated enough points to take the bout.

Taking the Australian Lightweight Title, March 1938
On March 12, 1938, Morgan first took the Australian Lightweight Title in a fourth-round knockout against Jimmy Dundee at Newcastle Stadium in Sydney, Australia. He impressively held the title until July 3, 1941, losing in a fifteen-round points decision against Vic Patrick that was quite unpopular with the crowd. He would lose twice more to Patrick in Sydney shortly before his retirement from boxing.

Morgan's last bout was on July 18, 1942, when he defeated Llew Edwards in a ten-round points decision in Melbourne, Australia.

By May 1943, Morgan was serving in the Australian Army where he reached the rank of Sergeant. He worked as a boxing instructor at American Army camps in Australia.

Return to America after WWII
On his return from Australia in the 1940s, Morgan worked as a bellboy and boxing referee in Seattle.

After a lengthy illness, he died in Seattle, Washington, on August 3, 1953, at the age of 50. He was survived by his wife, Grace, her son, Bill, whom he had adopted, and his mother.

Professional boxing record
All information in this section is derived from BoxRec, unless otherwise stated.

Official record

All newspaper decisions are officially regarded as “no decision” bouts and are not counted in the win/loss/draw column.

Unofficial record

Record with the inclusion of newspaper decisions in the win/loss/draw column.

See also
List of super featherweight boxing champions

References

External links
 
Tod Morgan - CBZ Profile

1902 births
1953 deaths
Boxers from Washington (state)
Boxers from California
Featherweight boxers
Super-featherweight boxers
World boxing champions
People from Sequim, Washington
American male boxers
People from Clallam County, Washington